Averell Spicer (born April 26, 1987) is a former American football defensive tackle. Spicer was signed by the Chicago Bears as an undrafted free agent in 2010. He played college football at USC.

Early years
Spicer prepped at Rancho Cucamonga High School in Rancho Cucamonga, California.

College career
Spicer played college football for the University of Southern California.

Professional career
An undrafted player from the USC Trojans, Averell was and signed by the Chicago Bears on May 3, 2010. He was waived/injured on August 9, 2010. He cleared waivers and reverted to Injured Reserve.

References

External links
 USC Trojans biography

1987 births
Living people
People from Rancho Cucamonga, California
American football defensive tackles
USC Trojans football players
Players of American football from California
Sportspeople from San Bernardino County, California
Chicago Bears players